Barbara Nedeljáková (born May 16, 1979) is a Slovak actress who is best known for her role as Natalya in the 2005 horror film Hostel.

Filmography

References

External links

 

1979 births
Living people
People from Banská Bystrica
Slovak film actresses
21st-century Slovak actresses